Zagorci is a settlement in the Municipality of Juršinci in northeastern Slovenia. The area is part of the traditional region of Styria. It lies in the valley of Little Brnca Creek, a minor left tributary of the Pesnica River, and the surrounding Slovene Hills. It is now included with the rest of the municipality in the Drava Statistical Region.

References

External links
Zagorci on Geopedia

Populated places in the Municipality of Juršinci